Manakampat Kesavan Unni Nayar (22 April 1911 – 12 August 1950) was an Indian military colonel, journalist, and diplomat who was killed in the Korean War while working on behalf of the United Nations.

Early life and education
He was born 22 April 1911 at Manakampat house near Parli,  from Palakkad in the state of Kerala in southern India. After an uneventful early education, he took his honours in Literature, from the Madras Christian College. His literary talents were first discovered, in the College Magazine. He began his professional career at a humorous weekly publication, The Merry Magazine of Madras. He soon moved to The Mail, a Madras daily, but continued to contribute to the Merry Magazine.

Career
Later, he worked in Washington, Singapore, Burma, Libya and various locations in the Middle East and North Africa. While serving as a U.N. delegate in Korea in 1950, he was killed (with journalists Christopher Buckley and Ian Morrison) by a land mine exploding under their jeep. A memorial dedicated to him is sited at Waegwan, South Korea.

An obituary published by the government of India said:

References

External links
Unni Nayar materials in the South Asian American Digital Archive (SAADA)
Historical Place in Korea in Memory of Unni Nayar 

1911 births
1950 deaths
Indian Army officers
Indian diplomats
Military personnel from Kerala
People from Palakkad district
Landmine victims
Military personnel killed in the Korean War
Journalists from Kerala
Indian humorists
War correspondents of World War II